45th meridian may refer to:

45th meridian east, a line of longitude east of the Greenwich Meridian
45th meridian west, a line of longitude west of the Greenwich Meridian